Zyoleny is a rural locality (a settlement) in Limannoye Rural Settlement, Pallasovsky District, Volgograd Oblast, Russia. The population was 42 as of 2010. There are 2 streets.

Geography 
Zyoleny is located on the Torgun River, 13 km east of Pallasovka (the district's administrative centre) by road. Limanny is the nearest rural locality.

References 

Rural localities in Pallasovsky District